The Meehambee Dolmen is a megalithic portal tomb dating from about 3500 BC located in County Roscommon, Ireland. 

Two local schoolchildren unearthed two stone axes in the 1960s.

Originally supported on 6 upright portals, 2.3 metres high, the capstone is estimated to weigh twenty-four tonnes. The portal stone supporting the back of the capstone has collapsed, allowing the capstone to slide backwards out of position, causing the doorstone to collapse also.  The capstone now rests at a 45-degree angle

It is thought that these tombs, of which over 1,200 have been identified in Ireland, were either the burial place of a single important king or chieftain or perhaps the tombs of several members of a tribe who inhabited the area in the Neolithic era.

It was known locally as Leabaidh Éirn in the 1930s.

Location
It is located in County Roscommon, a few hundred metres from the M6. It is accessed by a bridle path off a local road from the R362 regional road in the village of Bellanamullia on the western outskirts of Athlone.

Gallery

See also
 Dolmen
 Megalithic art
 European Megalithic Culture
 Gochang, Hwasun and Ganghwa Dolmen Sites
 Megalith
 Neolithic Europe
 Stone circle

References

External links

Dolmens in Ireland
Archaeological sites in County Roscommon
Tombs in the Republic of Ireland